Paul Frédéric Joseph Fourmarier (1877—1970) was a Belgian geologist and specialist in tectonics and stratigraphy, after whom the Fourmarierite mineral is named.

Fourmarier was born in La Hulpe, Province of Brabant, Belgium and studied at the University of Liège, graduating in 1899. He became a professor of geology at the university in 1920.

He won the Wollaston Medal in 1957 and the Penrose Gold Medal in 1952.

Research 
His specialist area was the study of fold structures and cleavage and he described the overthrust nappes in the Ardennes.
Fourmarier  was much involved in the geology of his native Belgium, as well as Zaire (then the Belgian Congo) and other African places. He also worked on continental drift.

Works 

 1901. Le bassin dévonien et carboniférien de Theux.
 1906. Pétrographie et paléontologie de la formation houillère de la campine, H. Vaillant-Carmanne (Liège).
 1907. La Tectonique de l’Ardenne.
 1916. La Tectonique du bassin houiller du Hainaut.
 1933. Principes de géologie.
 1934. Vue d'ensemble de la géologie de la Belgique.
 1939. Hydrogéologie: introduction à l'étude des eaux, destinées à l'alimentation humaine et à l'industrie, Paris.
 1954. Prodrome d'une description géologique de la Belgique. Geological Survey of Belgium, Liège, 826 p.

Memory 

An award named after him, the Fourmarier Prize, was established. In addition, a secondary uranium-lead mineral, fourmarierite, was named in his memory.

See also
 Gaston Briart
 Jean de Heinzelin de Braucourt
 William van Leckwijck

References

1877 births
1970 deaths
Belgian geologists
People from La Hulpe
Wollaston Medal winners
Penrose Medal winners
Academic staff of the University of Liège